Nikolaos "Nikos" Vetoulas (Greek: Νικόλαος "Νίκος" Βετούλας; born February 6, 1974, in Patras, Greece) is a retired Greek professional basketball player and coach, currently managing Apollon Patras of the Greek Basket League. As a player, he was a 1.93 m (6 ft 4 in) tall point guard.

Professional career
In his professional playing career, Vetoulas played in the top Greek League with: Apollon Patras, PAOK, Near East, Ionikos N.F., Aris, and AEK Athens. He won the Greek Cup with Aris in 2004.

He also played in the top Italian League with Udine, and in the top Spanish League with Murcia.

National team career
As a member of the Greek junior national team, Vetoulas played at the 1996 FIBA Europe Under-20 Championship.

Coaching career
Vetoulas started his coaching career with Aris in 2008, as an assistant coach to Andrea Mazzon. From 2010 to 2015, he coached Apollon Patras, where he managed to achieve promotion to the top-tier level Greek Basket League, up from the 2nd-tier level Greek A2 Basket League.

On May 28, 2016, Vetoulas was appointed as the head coach of the Swiss League club, SAM Massagno Basket, signing a two-year deal. On July 6, 2016, he left the Swiss club, in order to become the head coach of the top-tier level Greek club Promitheas Patras. On January 30, 2017, Vetoulas was appointed as the head coach of the Greek team Rethymno Cretan Kings. On June 25, 2018, he was appointed as the head coach of Kolossos Rodou.

During the 2020-2021 season, he led Apollon Patras to the Greek 2nd division championship and a promotion to the Greek Basket League after four seasons.

References

External links
EuroCup Profile
FIBA Europe Profile
FIBA Profile
Eurobasket.com Profile
Draftexpress.com Profile
Italian League Profile 
Spanish League Profile 
Hellenic Federation Profile 
AEK Profile

1974 births
Living people
AEK B.C. players
Apollon Patras B.C. coaches
Apollon Patras B.C. players
Aris B.C. players
CB Murcia players
Greek basketball coaches
Greek expatriate basketball people in Spain
Greek men's basketball players
Ionikos Nikaias B.C. coaches
Ionikos N.F. B.C. players
Kolossos Rodou B.C. coaches
Liga ACB players
Near East B.C. players
Pallalcesto Amatori Udine players
P.A.O.K. BC players
Basketball players from Patras
Point guards
Promitheas Patras B.C. coaches
Rethymno B.C. coaches
Shooting guards
Small forwards